Kaweka Forest Park is in the Hawke's Bay region of New Zealand, adjacent to Kaimanawa Forest Park.  This region of the central North Island contains large tracts of pine plantations, some of them also within the park, and as a consequence, invasive wilding conifers are present throughout the  park.

The Mangatutu Hot Springs, in the vicinity of the Mohaka River, are in the park.

History
In the late 1800s European settlers cleared the land for farming. However, the steep terrain and poor soil made it difficult to farm. By 1900 farming had ceased, and the park became a State Forest in the 1960s. During this period it was replanted with exotic pine trees and was turned into a Forest Park in 1972.

See also
Kaweka Range
Forest parks of New Zealand
Tramping in New Zealand

References

External links

Kaweka Forest Park – Department of Conservation

Hastings District
Forest parks of New Zealand
Protected areas of the Hawke's Bay Region